Dancy  is an unincorporated community in Pickens County, Alabama, United States.

History
Dancy is named for E. C. Dancy, who was a local physician. A post office operated under the name Dancy from 1892 to 1964.

References

Unincorporated communities in Pickens County, Alabama
Unincorporated communities in Alabama